I'll Kill Him and Return Alone (The Man Who Killed Billy the Kid; A Few Bullets More) is a 1967 Spanish drama-Western film directed by Julio Buchs, written by Lucio Fulci, composed by Gianni Ferrio and starring Peter Lee Lawrence, Fausto Tozzi and Dyanik Zurakowska. It is about Pat Garrett and Billy the Kid.

Cast

References

External links
 

1967 films
1967 Western (genre) films
Biographical films about Billy the Kid
Cultural depictions of Pat Garrett
Films produced by Ricardo Sanz
Films scored by Gianni Ferrio
Films shot in Almería
Films shot in Madrid
Films shot in Rome
Films with screenplays by Lucio Fulci
Something Weird Video
Spanish Western (genre) films
1960s American films